The frontbench of Her Majesty's Loyal Opposition in the Parliament of the United Kingdom consists of the Shadow Cabinet and other shadow ministers of the political party currently serving as the Official Opposition. From 2015 to 2020, Her Majesty's Loyal Opposition was the Labour Party, and the Leader of the Opposition was Jeremy Corbyn.

Key

Leader of the Opposition and Cabinet Office

Devolved and local government

Digital, culture, media and sport

Economy

Environment

Foreign relations

Law and order

Parliament

Social services

Transport

Women and equalities

Reshuffles and changes

2015

2016 
January

Paula Sherriff resigned as Jon Trickett's PPS.

Jim McMahon was appointed PPS to Tom Watson, Deputy Leader of the Labour Party.

February

Naz Shah was appointed PPS to John McDonnell, Shadow Chancellor.

April

Naz Shah resigned as a PPS after her past comments about Israel were uncovered.

October

Karin Smyth was appointed as PPS to Keir Starmer, Shadow Brexit Secretary.

2017 
July

The following appointments were made:

 Dan Carden as PPS to Rebecca Long-Bailey, Shadow BEIS Secretary.
Helen Goodman as a Shadow Foreign Affairs Minister, with responsibilities including the Americas, Australasia, Far East and Polar Regions.
 Emma Hardy as PPS to Keir Starmer, Shadow Brexit Secretary.
 Jo Platt as PPS to Angela Rayner, Shadow Education Secretary.
 Luke Pollard as PPS to Sue Hayman, Shadow DEFRA Secretary.
 Matt Rodda as PPS to Andy McDonald, Shadow Transport Secretary.
 Danielle Rowley as PPS to Emily Thornberry, Shadow Foreign Secretary.
 Lloyd Russell-Moyle as PPS to Richard Burgon, Shadow Justice Secretary.

2018 
January

The following appointments were made:

 Mike Amesbury as PPS to Debbie Abrahams, Shadow Work and Pensions Secretary.
Lyn Brown as a Shadow Treasury Minister, responsible for social inclusion and mobility.
 Bambos Charalambous as PPS to Rebecca Long-Bailey.
 Emma Dent Coad as PPS to Jon Trickett.
 Rosie Duffield as PPS to Dawn Butler.
Clive Lewis as a Shadow Treasury Minister, responsible for economic sustainability.
 Sarah Jones as PPS to John Healey.

February

The following appointments were made:

 Ruth George as PPS to Andy McDonald, Shadow Transport Secretary.
 Ged Killen as PPS to Nia Griffith, Shadow Defence Secretary.
 Ellie Reeves as PPS to Kate Osamor, Shadow International Development Secretary.

May

James Frith was appointed PPS to John Healey, Shadow Housing Secretary.

June

Shadow Cabinet Office Minister Laura Smith and PPSs Tonia Antoniazzi, Rosie Duffield, Ged Killen, Anna McMorrin and Ellie Reeves resigned on 13 June after defying the whip on a Brexit vote.

July

Karin Smyth, Shadow Deputy Commons Leader, was appointed Shadow Northern Ireland Minister. Luke Pollard was promoted from PPS to the Shadow DEFRA Secretary to Shadow DEFRA Minister on an acting basis whilst Holly Lynch was on maternity leave.

October

Sandy Martin was appointed Shadow DEFRA Minister.

2019 
January

Diane Abbott replaced Kate Osamor as a front bench representative on the Labour NEC.

March

Alex Norris was appointed Shadow International Development Minister on an acting basis.

Ruth Smeeth resigned as PPS to Tom Watson after serving in the role for two years.

April

Alex Cunningham was appointed Shadow Housing Minister.

July

Stephen Morgan was appointed Shadow Communities and Local Government Minister. Justin Madders was appointed acting Shadow BEIS Minister whilst Laura Pidcock as maternity cover for Laura Pidcock, and continued to serve in the Health and Social Care team.

Gloria de Piero resigned as a Shadow Justice Minister.

August

Alex Sobel was appointed as PPS to Emily Thornberry, Shadow Foreign Secretary.

2020 
January

Ruth Jones, Alan Whitehead and Daniel Zeichner were appointed as Shadow DEFRA Ministers, Tulip Siddiq as Shadow Education Minister, Catherine West as Shadow DCMS Minister, and Abena Oppong-Asare and Navendu Mishra appointed as PPSs.

Later in the month, the following appointments were made:

 Bambos Charalambous as a Shadow Justice Minister, leading on legal aid and victims.
 Helen Hayes as an Opposition Whip.
 Conor McGinn as an Opposition Whip.
Kate Osborne as PPS to Diane Abbott, Shadow Home Secretary.
 Stephanie Peacock as a Shadow Cabinet Office Minister, responsible for the Office of Veterans and government procurement.
 Bell Ribeiro-Addy as Shadow Immigration Minister.
 Zarah Sultana as PPS to Dan Carden, Shadow International Development Secretary.

February

Claudia Webbe was appointed PPS to Margaret Greenwood, Shadow Work and Pensions Secretary, on 26 February.

March

Rachel Hopkins was appointed PPS to Richard Burgon, Shadow Justice Secretary.

Notes

References 

Labour Party (UK) shadow cabinets
Jeremy Corbyn
Official Opposition (United Kingdom)